Puya maculata is a species of plant in the family Bromeliaceae. It is endemic to Ecuador.  Its natural habitat is subtropical or tropical high-altitude grassland. It is threatened by habitat loss.

References

Flora of Ecuador
maculata
Least concern plants
Taxonomy articles created by Polbot